The Red Army was the army of Soviet Russia (1918–1922) and the Soviet Union (1922–1946)

Red Army may also refer to:

Armies
Bavarian Red Army of the Bavarian Soviet Republic
Catholic and Royal Army of west France royalists opposed to the French Revolution, also known as the "Red Army" due to their Sacred Heart emblem
Chinese Red Army, later known as the People's Liberation Army
Hungarian Red Army of the Hungarian Soviet Republic
Mongolian People's Army, the Red Army of Mongolia

Insurgent, militia, militant and terrorist groups
Red Army Faction (1970–1998), a far-left militant terrorist group in Germany
Red Army Faction (1968-1971), a far-left communist militant organization originating in Japan
Japanese Red Army (1971–2001), an international communist terrorist group originating in Japan
United Red Army (1971–1972), a Japanese far-left domestic terrorist group
Lal Sena ("Red Army", 1974–1990), a communist militia group in northwestern India
Red Army of Turin, Italy, formed in 1919 to defend socialist activities
Red Brigades (1970–2000s), a violent Italian insurgent group
Ruhr Red Army (1920), a large military organisation of the Ruhr Workers Councils in Germany

Sports
HC CSKA Moscow, the ice hockey team of the Central Sports Army Club in Moscow, Russia, often called "Red Army" by English speakers
Persepolis F.C., a football team from Tehran, Iran, often called "Red Army" by media and supporters
 Red Army, another name for the Russian Five ice hockey line of the Detroit Red Wings in the NHL in the 1990s
Red Army (football), football hooligan firm of Manchester United FC, England

Other
 Red Army, the opposing force to the Blue Army in the American web series machinima Red vs. Blue
 Red Army (film), a 2014 documentary about the Soviet hockey team
Red Army (novel), a 1989 cold-war novel by Ralph Peters
 Red Army Standard Ammunition, a brand and supplier of ammunition cartridges in the United States

See also 
 Red Guards (disambiguation)
 Red Ribbon Army in Dragon Ball
 Soviet Army, successor of the Red Army